Samuel Morse (1585-1654) was an original proprietor of Dedham, Massachusetts who served on the board of selectmen for two years. He was also a founder of Medfield, Massachusetts when it broke away from Dedham. He was elected a selectman before joining the First Church and Parish in Dedham. He was a signer of the Dedham Covenant.

Morse was born in England in 1585 and came to Dedham from London. With his wife, Elizabeth, he was the father of Joseph, Abigail, John, Daniel, Samuel, Jeremiah, and Mary. He died in 1654. It was said in 1907 that "no family has ranked higher in eastern Massachusetts for the past two hundred and fifty years than the descendants" of Morse. He was the grandfather of Ezra Morse.

References

Works cited

Dedham, Massachusetts selectmen
Signers of the Dedham Covenant
People from London
1585 births
1654 deaths
Kingdom of England emigrants to Massachusetts Bay Colony
People from colonial Dedham, Massachusetts